Khek Khemrin (born 10 January 1989) is a former Cambodian footballer who last played for National Defense Ministry in the Cambodian League and the Cambodia national team.

Honours

Club
National Defense Ministry
Hun Sen Cup: 2010, 2016

References 

1989 births
Living people
Cambodian footballers
Cambodia international footballers
Association football defenders